Vilashahr or Vila Shahr may refer to:
 Vilashahr, Isfahan
 Vila Shahr, GOLESTAN
 Vila Shahr, Razavi Khorasan